Chã de Alegria is a city located in the state of Pernambuco, Brazil. Located  at 54 km away from Recife, capital of the state of Pernambuco. Has an estimated (IBGE 2020) population of 13,556 inhabitants.

Geography
 State - Pernambuco
 Region - Zona da mata Pernambucana
 Boundaries - Paudalho   (N);  Vitória de Santo Antão    (S);  São Lourenço da Mata   (E); Glória do Goitá   (W)
 Area - 48.45 km2
 Elevation - 160 m
 Hydrography - Capibaribe River
 Vegetation - Caducifólia forest
 Climate - Hot tropical and humid
 Annual average temperature - 25.0 c
 Distance to Recife - 54 km

Economy
The main economic activities in Chã de Alegria are based in agribusiness, especially sugarcane, coconuts; and livestock such as cattle and poultry.

Economic indicators

Economy by Sector
2006

Health indicators

References

Municipalities in Pernambuco